GENUIN is an independent classical music label and remote classical music recording studio based in Leipzig, Germany. The term “genuin” comes from Latin and stands for “innate, authentic, not counterfeit.”

History 

The company was founded in Detmold, Germany in 1998 as "GENUIN Musikproduktion" by sound engineers Holger Busse and Alfredo Lasheras Hakobian. Five years later, in January 2003, the "GENUIN" classical music label began distributing CDs throughout Germany, with most releases produced by its own recording engineers.
 
In 2005, the company moved from Detmold to Leipzig as a result of which a fruitful collaboration with German broadcaster MDR and the famed Leipzig Gewandhaus resulted. In January 2006 recording engineer Michael Silberhorn joined the company.

During 2009 GENUIN Musikproduktion restructured operations and now consists of its “GENUIN classics” label and music production company "GENUIN recording group."

Repertoire and awards 

In addition to the gamut of classical music repertoire, ranging from the Renaissance to New Music, the label also focuses on rarely performed works and promoting talented young recording artists. The label’s catalog now encompasses some 200 classical music CDs which are distributed internationally through specialist CD retailers, record stores and online download platforms.

GENUIN recordings have, among other commendations, won the 2010 ECHO Klassik, the Diapason d'Or as well as nominations for the Grammy Award and the MIDEM Classical Award.

Musicians and Ensembles 

Some musicians and ensembles who have recorded with GENUIN sound engineers:

Orchestras 
GENUIN recording engineers have worked with the following orchestras:

References

External links 
 Official site

GENUIN classics
German record labels
1998 establishments in Germany